The women's 4 x 400 metres relay event at the 1997 European Athletics U23 Championships was held in Turku, Finland, on 13 July 1997.

Medalists

Results

Final
13 July

Participation
According to an unofficial count, 28 athletes from 7 countries participated in the event.

 (4)
 (4)
 (4)
 (4)
 (4)
 (4)
 (4)

References

4 x 400 metres relay
Relays at the European Athletics U23 Championships